Painted Cliffs is an irregular line of cliffs which extend southwest from Mount Picciotto and mark the southeast edge of Prince Andrew Plateau. Named by the New Zealand Geological Survey Antarctic Expedition (NZGSAE) (1961–62) because of the colored sedimentary and igneous rock layers exposed on the face of the cliffs.

Cliffs of the Ross Dependency
Shackleton Coast